Legislative elections were held in the Gambia in 1951. They were the first election to feature political parties, as the Democratic Party and the Muslim Congress Party had been founded earlier in the year.

Results
There were only three elected seats in the Legislative Council at the time.

References

Gambia
Parliamentary elections in the Gambia
1951 in the Gambia
Gambia Colony and Protectorate